Events from the year 1991 in Scotland.

Incumbents 

 Secretary of State for Scotland and Keeper of the Great Seal – Ian Lang

Law officers 
 Lord Advocate – Lord Fraser of Carmyllie
 Solicitor General for Scotland – Alan Rodger

Judiciary 
 Lord President of the Court of Session and Lord Justice General – Lord Hope
 Lord Justice Clerk – Lord Ross
 Chairman of the Scottish Land Court – Lord Elliott

Events 
 4 April – South Ronaldsay child abuse scandal: Social services in Orkney are criticised for their handling of more than 100 children who have returned to their families after being taken away over allegations of child abuse.
 18 May – Motherwell F.C. triumph 4–3 over Dundee United to win the Scottish Cup.
 8 July – Inauguration of full electric service on British Rail's East Coast Main Line from London King's Cross railway station through to Edinburgh Waverley.
 9 July – Western Isles Council loses £23,000,000 in the closure of the Bank of Credit and Commerce International.
 25 July – Age of Legal Capacity (Scotland) Act 1991, which gives full legal capacity to those aged over sixteen, receives the Royal Assent.
 13 August – The Duke of Rothesay (now Charles III), resigns as patron of Scotland's National Museum over a competition to design a new building.
 27 August – Dornoch Firth Bridge opened.
 29 August – Alick Buchanan-Smith, Conservative MP for Kincardine and Deeside, dies in office aged 59.
 30 August – Liz McColgan wins a gold medal at the World Athletics Championships in Tokyo, Japan.
 October – Privatisation of the Scottish Bus Group concludes with sale of Western Scottish in a management buyout.
 7 November – Kincardine and Deeside by-election results in the Liberal Democrats gaining the seat from the Conservative Party on a swing of 11.4%.
 1 December - American grunge rock band Nirvana perform at The Southern Bar in Edinburgh. They were invited as guests of the Joyriders, who were initially unsure if the band would turn up or not.
 Highlands and Islands Enterprise supersedes the Highlands and Islands Development Board.
 Publication of Vera Carstairs' and Russell Morris' Deprivation and Health in Scotland by Aberdeen University Press, introducing the Carstairs index of deprivation.
 Closure of Blindwells opencast coal mining site ends 269 years of coal mining in East Lothian.

Births 
 10 February – Rebecca Dempster, footballer
 13 February – Declan Gallagher, footballer
 22 February – Kyle Wilkie, footballer
 13 May – Jen Beattie, footballer
 3 July – Alison Howie, field hockey player
 13 August – Lesley Doig, lawn bowler
 12 September – Mike Towell, boxer (died 2016)
 23 September – Lee Alexander, footballer
 1 October – Jennifer Dodds, curler
 2 October – Gordon Reid, wheelchair tennis player
 14 October – Andrew Butchart, distance runner
 7 November – Rachel Sermanni, folk musician
 17 December – Tom Walker, indie folk-rock singer-songwriter
 20 December – Rachael Boyle, footballer

Deaths 
 2 February – Sir Monty Finniston, industrialist (born 1912)
 27 June – George MacLeod, soldier and minister of religion (born 1895)
 29 August – Alick Buchanan-Smith, Conservative politician (born 1932)

The arts
 October – Irvine Welsh's short story "The First Day of the Edinburgh Festival", later incorporated into Trainspotting, is published in New Writing Scotland.
 Robert Alan Jamieson's novel A Day at the Office is published.
 Jackie Kay's first, semi-autobiographical, poetry collection The Adoption Papers is published.

See also 
 1991 in Northern Ireland

References 

 
Scotland
Years of the 20th century in Scotland
1990s in Scotland